Eqlid County is in Fars province, Iran. The capital of the county is the city of Eqlid. At the 2006 census, the county's population was 99,003 in 21,216 households. The following census in 2011 counted 93,975 people in 25,048 households, by which time Khosrow Shirin Rural District had been separated from the county to join Abadeh County. At the 2016 census, the county's population was 93,763 in 27,421 households.

Administrative divisions

The population history and structural changes of Eqlid County's administrative divisions over three consecutive censuses are shown in the following table. The latest census shows three districts, eight rural districts, and four cities.

References

 

Counties of Fars Province